Events in the year 1974 in Chile.

Incumbents
President: Augusto Pinochet
Commander-in-chief of the Chilean Army: Augusto Pinochet

Events

January
January 2 - A strong earthquake affected the Province of El Loa. The movement originated at 07:44 hrs. and had a magnitude of 6.8º Richter. The epicenter was recorded in the Salar de Ascotán sector.

February
February 3 - The XV International Song Festival of Viña del Mar is held. Hosted by César Antonio Santis and Gabriela Velasco.

March
March 11 - The Governing Board issues its "Declaration of Principles".
March 16 - Augusto Pinochet travels to Brazil to witness the assumption of command by retired general Ernesto Geisel.

April
April 27 - Carabineros de Chile becomes part of the Ministry of National Defense.

May

June
June 15 - Decree Law 512 formally establishes the Dirección de Inteligencia Nacional (DINA).
June 20 - Through Decree Law 527, Augusto Pinochet becomes "Supreme Chief of the Nation".

July
July 21 - A group of unknown individuals shoots in Beirut the Chilean ambassador to Lebanon, Alfredo Canales Márquez.

August
August 9 – VLCC Metula oil spill
August 18 - The 1974 Oran Earthquake can be felt in the cities of Calama and Antofagasta, stopping the operation of the Chuquicamata mine.

September

October
October 3 - An earthquake shakes the Tarapacá Region (Arica and Parinacota Region), with an intensity of 4.5 Richter Scale. This is due to the earthquake that occurred in Lima, Perú.
October 16 - The Colegio de Profesores de Chile is created, replacing the Single Union of Education Workers, which functioned between 1970 and 1973.
October 26 - Decree Law No. 527, which established the Statute of the Governing Board, separating the exercise of constituent and legislative powers from the executive branch, is published in the Official Gazette. The first two were established in the Governing Board and the executive would be exercised by the President of the Governing Board, who would be the Supreme Chief of the Nation.

November

December

Births
date unknown – Patricia Pérez Goldberg
January 2 – Rossana Dinamarca
January 12 – Claudia Conserva
February 27 – Carolina Fadic (d. 2002)
March 3 – Álvaro Espinoza
March 10 – Cristián de la Fuente
April 8 – Luis Fernando Sepúlveda
April 13 – Moisés Ávila
May 7 – Ricardo Francisco Rojas
May 26 – Enrique Osses
June 17 – Javiera Contador
June 18 – Sigrid Alegría
June 26 – Pablo Galdames
July 22 – Francisco Rojas Rojas
September 14 – Marlen Olivari
November 26 – José Miguel Viñuela
November 28 – Ena von Baer
December 24 – Marcelo Salas

Deaths
March 12 – Alberto Bachelet, Chilean Air Force Brigadier General, father of Michelle Bachelet, heart attack (b. 1923)
March 15 – José Tohá, former Minister of the Interior (b. 1927)
September 30 – Carlos Prats, former Minister of National Defense, car bomb in Buenos Aires, Argentina (b. 1915)
October 5 – Miguel Enríquez (politician), shot (b. 1944)

 
1970s in Chile
Years of the 20th century in Chile
Chile